Afroxanthodynerus is an Afrotropical genus of potter wasps.

References

Potter wasps
Hymenoptera genera